Glenridge is a community in the city of St. Catharines, Ontario, Canada. It is located in the south part of the city, spanning the downtown in the north to Glendale Avenue in the south. On the east side, it is bounded by Highway 406 and the 12 Mile Creek on the west.

Old Glen Ridge, in the Northern portion of the community, is home to many historic Tudor-style houses on large lots.  Burgoyne Woods, St. Catharines' largest municipal park, is located in the east end of the community near the historic routing of the Welland Canal.  The portion of the community south of the CN Rail tracks, along with Riverview and Marsdale, is home to many Brock University faculty and students.

Neighbourhoods in St. Catharines